This page is a chronological listing of the premiership winners in the South Australian National Football League (SANFL) – the premier Australian rules football competition in the state of South Australia.

Chronological list

Number of SANFL premierships by club

 * Defunct Clubs
 ** Original Old Adelaide Club first formed in 1860, merged with Kensington for the 1881 season but resigned from the competition after 4 games.
 ** Old Adelaide rejoined in 1885, won the premiership in 1886, but disbanded for the final time in 1893
 The original Adelaide Football Club is not related to the current Adelaide Football Club
 West Torrens merged with Woodville at the end of 1990 season to form Woodville-West Torrens

Consecutive SANFL premierships and Grand Final Appearances

 Grand Finals only commenced in 1898 (excluding playoffs in 1889 and 1894)

Champions of Australia
The Championship of Australia was the name given to an Australian rules football tournament which was contested between football clubs from the Victorian, South Australian, West Australian and Tasmania football leagues. The Championship took place three times in the 19th century and then from 1907 to 1914 with the exception of 1912 and every year from 1968 to 1975.

SANFL Grand Final Records
Prior to 1974 all SANFL Grand Finals were held at the Adelaide Oval (bar the 1904 Grand Final at Jubilee Oval).
From 1974 to 2013 they were held at Football Park.
From 2014 onwards they returned to Adelaide Oval.
 Largest Attendance at Football Park: 66,897 - Sturt 17.14 (116) d Port Adelaide 10.15 (75), 1976
 Smallest Attendance at Football Park: 22,207 - Central District 23.15 (153) d Woodville-West Torrens 4.4 (28), 2004
 Largest Attendance at Adelaide Oval: 62,543 - Port Adelaide 12.8 (80) d Sturt 12.5 (77), 1965
 Highest Score: 24.15 (159) Sturt d Glenelg 13.16 (94), 1969
 Lowest Score: 1.6 (12) Port Adelaide lost to North Adelaide 6.8 (44), 1905
 Largest Winning Margin: 125 points - Central District 23.15 (153) d Woodville-West Torrens 4.4 (28), 2004
 Smallest Winning Margin: 1 point - Norwood 8.4 (52) d West Torrens 7.9 (51), 1925 & Norwood 16.15 (111) d Sturt 14.26 (110), 1978 & Sturt 7.8 (50) d Port Adelaide 7.7 (49), 2017 & Norwood 8.11 (59) d North Adelaide 8.10 (58), 2022
 Highest Losing Score: 19.16 (130) - North Adelaide lost to Glenelg 21.11 (137), 1973
 Lowest Winning Score: 3.5 (23) - Sturt d North Adelaide 2.6 (18), 1919
 Highest Match Aggregate: 267 points - Glenelg 21.11 (137) d North Adelaide 19.16 (130), 1973
 Lowest Match Aggregate: 41 points - North Adelaide 4.3 (27) d South Adelaide 1.8 (14), 1900 & Sturt 3.5 (23) d North Adelaide 2.6 (18), 1919

Minor grades

Reserves premiership
Reserve grade premierships are contested between the existing SANFL clubs, with the exception of Adelaide (who have never fielded a team in the SANFL Reserves) and Port Adelaide (who were removed from the competition in 2018). Official SANFL records recognise premierships going back to 1919, however the first Association league (that operated underneath the SAFA premiership) commenced in 1906, as can be seen in the list of premiers below.

1906: Norwood (1)
1907: Portland Imperial (1)
1908: Portland Imperial (2)
1909: Sturt (1)
1910: Norwood (2)
1911: Port Adelaide (1)
1912: North Adelaide (1)
1913: Sturt (2)
1914: South Adelaide (1)
1915: West Torrens (1)
1916–18: None (WW1)
1919: West Torrens (2)
1920: West Torrens (3)
1921: Norwood (3)
1922: West Torrens (4)
1923: Port Adelaide (2)
1924: West Torrens (5)
1925: North Adelaide (2)
1926: West Torrens (6)
1927: West Torrens (7)
1928: North Adelaide (3)
1929: West Adelaide (1)
1930: Norwood (4)
1931: West Torrens (8) 
1932: North Adelaide (4)
1933: Port Adelaide (3)
1934: North Adelaide (5)
1935: West Torrens (9)
1936: Port Adelaide (4)
1937: Norwood (5)
1938: Norwood (6)

1939: Norwood (7)
1940: West Adelaide (2)
1941: West Torrens (10)
1942–45: None (WW2)
1946: West Torrens (11)
1947: Port Adelaide (5)
1948: Port Adelaide (6)
1949: Sturt (3)
1950: West Torrens (12)
1951: West Adelaide (3)
1952: Port Adelaide (7)
1953: West Torrens (13)
1954: West Torrens (14)
1955: Port Adelaide (8)
1956: Port Adelaide (9)
1957: Port Adelaide (10)
1958: Port Adelaide (11)
1959: Port Adelaide (12)
1960: Norwood (8)
1961: Norwood (9)
1962: West Torrens (15)
1963: Port Adelaide (13)
1964: North Adelaide (6)
1965: North Adelaide (7)
1966: North Adelaide (8)
1967: Glenelg (1)
1968: West Torrens (16)
1969: Norwood (10)
1970: Norwood (11)
1971: Central District (1)
1972: Norwood (12)

1973: Woodville (1)
1974: Norwood (13)
1975: Norwood (14)
1976: Norwood (15)
1977: Sturt (4)
1978: Norwood (16)
1979: South Adelaide (2)
1980: Port Adelaide (14)
1981: Glenelg (2)
1982: Glenelg (3)
1983: Port Adelaide (15)
1984: West Torrens (17)
1985: Norwood (17)
1986: Norwood (18)
1987: Woodville (2)
1988: Port Adelaide (16)
1989: Central District (2)
1990: West Torrens (18)
1991: South Adelaide (3)
1992: Woodville-West Torrens (1)
1993: Woodville-West Torrens (2)
1994: West Adelaide (4)
1995: Norwood (19)
1996: Port Adelaide (17)
1997: Port Adelaide (18)
1998: Norwood (20)
1999: Sturt (5)
2000: Woodville-West Torrens (3)
2001: Woodville-West Torrens (4)
2002: Central District (3)
2003: Central District (4)

2004: Woodville-West Torrens (5)
2005: North Adelaide (9)
2006: North Adelaide (10)
2007: Glenelg (4)
2008: Sturt (6)
2009: Glenelg (5) 
2010: Port Adelaide (19)
2011: Glenelg (6)
2012: Central District (5)
2013: Woodville-West Torrens (6)
2014: Woodville-West Torrens (7)
2015: Woodville-West Torrens (8)
2016: North Adelaide (11)
2017: Sturt (7)
2018: North Adelaide (12)
2019: Norwood (21)
2020: Woodville-West Torrens (9)
2021: Glenelg (7)
2022: Sturt (8)
Source where unlisted

Thirds/Under 19s/17s & U18s/16s
Thirds-grade competitions for SANFL clubs featuring underage players seeking to enter reserves/senior-level football have been in place since the late 1930s. Under-19 and under-17 premierships were scheduled from 1937/1939 to 2008, after which they were replaced with an under 18 competition (initially known as the Maccas Cup) in 2009 and an under 16 series (initially known as the Maccas Shield) in 2010. Note that Port Adelaide's participation in these competitions ended in 2014.

Under 19s premiership (1937–2008)

1937: North Adelaide (1)
1938: West Torrens (1)
1939: West Torrens (2)
1940: Norwood (1)
1941: West Torrens (3)
1942: North Adelaide (2)
1943: West Adelaide (1)
1944: West Adelaide (2)
1945: Norwood (2)
1946: Port Adelaide (1)
1947: Norwood (3)
1948: North Adelaide (3)
1949: North Adelaide (4)
1950: Port Adelaide (2)
1951: Sturt (1)
1952: Norwood (4)
1953: Port Adelaide (3)
1954: North Adelaide (5)
1955: West Torrens (4)
1956: West Torrens (5)
1957: West Torrens (6)

1958: Sturt (2)
1959: Glenelg (1)
1960: Norwood (5)
1961: North Adelaide (6)
1962: Port Adelaide (4)
1963: Norwood (6)
1964: Sturt (3)
1965: Norwood (7)
1966: North Adelaide (7)
1967: Glenelg (2)
1968: West Adelaide (3)
1969: Glenelg (3)
1970: Central District (1)
1971: Norwood (8)
1972: Norwood (9)
1973: West Torrens (7)
1974: Port Adelaide (5)
1975: Port Adelaide (6)
1976: Port Adelaide (7)
1977: Port Adelaide (8)
1978: West Adelaide (4)

1979: Glenelg (4)
1980: Norwood (10)
1981: Central District (2)
1982: Central District (3)
1983: Norwood (11)
1984: Sturt (4)
1985: Norwood (12)
1986: Norwood (13)
1987: Sturt (5)
1988: Norwood (14)
1989: West Torrens (8)
1990: Norwood (15)
1991: Port Adelaide (9)
1992: Glenelg (5)
1993: South Adelaide (1)
1994: South Adelaide (2)
1995: Norwood (16)
1996: Woodville-West Torrens (1)
1997: Norwood (17)
1998: Woodville-West Torrens (2)

1999: Port Adelaide (10)
2000: Woodville-West Torrens (3)
2001: Port Adelaide (11)
2002: West Adelaide (5)
2003: Central District (4)
2004: West Adelaide (6)
2005: North Adelaide (8)
2006: Port Adelaide (12)
2007: Port Adelaide (13)
2008: Glenelg (6)
Source where unlisted:

Under 17s premiership (1939–2008)

1939: North Adelaide (1)
1940: North Adelaide (2)
1941: Sturt (1)
1942-46: None (WW2)
1947: North Adelaide (3)
1948: West Adelaide (1)
1949: Sturt (2)
1950: North Adelaide (4)
1951: Port Adelaide (1) 
1952: North Adelaide (5)
1953: West Torrens (1)
1954: West Torrens (2)
1955: Port Adelaide (2)
1956: North Adelaide (6)
1957: West Torrens (3)
1958: Glenelg (1)
1959: Glenelg (2)
1960: Glenelg (3)
1961: Port Adelaide (3)
1962: Woodville (1)

1963: Sturt (3)
1964: Woodville (2)
1965: Norwood (1) 
1966: Central District (1)
1967: Woodville (2)
1968: Woodville (3)
1969: North Adelaide (7)
1970: North Adelaide (8)
1971: Port Adelaide (4)
1972: Port Adelaide (5)
1973: Woodville (4)
1974: Sturt (4)
1975: Glenelg (4)
1976: Sturt (5)
1977: Central District (2)
1978: Central District (3)
1979: Central District (4)
1980: Sturt (6)
1981: Norwood (2)
1982: Norwood (3)

1983: Norwood (4)
1984: Norwood (5)
1985: Central District (5)
1986: Norwood (6)
1987: North Adelaide (9)
1988: Norwood (7)
1989: Norwood (8)
1990: South Adelaide (1)
1991: Norwood (9)
1992: Central District (6)
1993: Woodville-West Torrens (1)
1994: Port Adelaide (6)
1995: South Adelaide (2)
1996: Central District (7)
1997: North Adelaide (10)
1998: Woodville-West Torrens (2)
1999: Woodville-West Torrens (3)

2000: Woodville-West Torrens (4)
2001: West Adelaide (2)
2002: West Adelaide (3)
2003: Sturt (7)
2004: Central District (8)
2005: North Adelaide (11)
2006: West Adelaide (4)
2007: North Adelaide (12)
2008: Sturt (8)
Source where unlisted:

Under 18s premiership (2009–present)

2009: Glenelg (1)
2010: Glenelg (2)
2011: Port Adelaide (1)
2012: Woodville-West Torrens (1)
2013: Woodville-West Torrens (2)
2014: West Adelaide (1)
2015: Norwood (1)

2016: Glenelg (3)
2017: Sturt (1)
2018: Woodville-West Torrens (3)
2019: Woodville-West Torrens (4)
2020: Norwood (2)
2021: Woodville-West Torrens (5)
2022: Glenelg (4)

Under 16s premiership (2010–present)

2010: North Adelaide (1)
2011: North Adelaide (2)
2012: Norwood (1)
2013: North Adelaide (3)
2014: Glenelg (1)
2015: Sturt (1)
2016: Glenelg (2)

2017: Glenelg (3)
2018: Glenelg (4)
2019: Glenelg (5)
2020: Cancelled due to COVID-19 pandemic
2021: South Adelaide (1)
2022: Woodville West Torrens (1)

References

External links
Full Points Footy: SANFL Summary Chart
Official South Australian National Football League website

See also
List of SANFL minor premiers
List of SANFL Women's League premiers

South Australian National Football League
Australian rules football-related lists
Australian rules football records and statistics